The 2015 Montreux Volley Masters is a women's volleyball competition set in Montreux, Switzerland between May 26 – 31, 2015. Turkey won the tournament for the first time by winning 3-2 to Japan in the championship match. Japanese Yuki Ishii was selected Most Valuable Player.

Participating teams

Squads

Group stage

Group A

|}

|}

Group B

|}

|}

Classification round

|}

Final round

Semifinals

|}

Third place match

|}

Final

|}

Final standings

Awards

Most Valuable Player
  Yuki Ishii
Best Outside Spikers	
  Yuki Ishii
  Anne Buijs
Best Libero
  Kotoki Zayasu
	
Best Middle Blockers	
  Yvon Belien
  Büşra Cansu
Best Setter
  Naz Aydemir 
Best Opposite Spiker
  Lonneke Slöetjes

References

External links
Official website

2015
Montreux Volley Masters
Montreux Volley Masters